The following is a list of Amstrad PCW games organised alphabetically by name.

0–9
3D Clock Chess
500 c.c. Championship

A

B

C

D-E

F

G

H

I-J-K

L

M-N-O

P

Q-R

S

T

U-V

W-X-Y-Z

External links
Amstrad PCW at Adventureland
Carátulas de los juegos del PCW

See also
Lists of video games
List of Amstrad CPC games

 
Amstrad PCW